Air Europa Líneas Aéreas, S.A.U., branded as Air Europa, is the third-largest Spanish airline after Iberia and Vueling. The airline is headquartered in Llucmajor, Mallorca, Spain; it has its main hub at Adolfo Suárez Madrid–Barajas Airport with focus city operations at Palma de Mallorca Airport and Tenerife North Airport. Air Europa flies to over 44 destinations in Spain, the rest of Europe, South America, North America, the Caribbean, Morocco and Tunisia. Since September 2007, Air Europa has been a member of the SkyTeam alliance.

History

Early years
Air Europa started in 1986 (registered in Spain as Air España SA and previously known as such) as part of the British ILG-Air Europe Group and 75% owned by Spanish banks. It originally had a similar livery to Air Europe but with Air Europa titles and its aircraft were registered in Spain. It flew holiday charters from Mediterranean resorts and European cities using Boeing 737-300s and Boeing 757s. It was the first Spanish private company to operate national scheduled flights (besides charter flights which used to be its main business).

When parent company ILG ceased trading in 1991 Air Europa continued profitably with a larger fleet of Boeing 737s and 757s. It signed a franchise agreement with Iberia in January 1998, but this has since been dissolved. It is now owned by Globalia Corporación Empresarial S.A.

At the end of the 1990s, Boeing 737-800 jets were introduced along with a new livery. In June 2005, it was announced Air Europa was among four future associate members of the SkyTeam alliance, due to join by 2006. However, the joining date was postponed, and it did not become a member until 1 September 2007. Air Europa was the parent company for Air Dominicana, the new flag carrier of the Dominican Republic, until bankruptcy was declared on 21 September 2009.

Developments since 2010
Air Europa retired its last Boeing 767 on 13 April 2012.

On 22 May 2019, the National Civil Aviation Agency of Brazil (ANAC) granted Air Europa permission to operate domestic flights in the country. This was the first time a foreign company was granted such authorisation, after Brazilian laws were changed to allow full foreign ownership of domestic airlines. As of June 2019, no details were available about Air Europa's future domestic operations in Brazil, a market which the airline already serves with international flights from Madrid to Salvador and Recife.

Proposed acquisition by International Airlines Group
On 4 November 2019, International Airlines Group announced its €1 billion ($1.1 billion) acquisition of Air Europa from Globalia. The deal was supposed to close in the first half of 2020. Air Europa operated 66 aircraft and generated a €100 million operating profit in 2018. The brand was to be retained initially within Iberia, with IAG expecting to see a return on investment by the fourth year, with full synergy by 2025: Intra-group codeshares, Madrid timing adjustments, sales and loyalty programmes alignment. Air Europa's parent company Globalia, a travel and tourism company managed by Juan José Hidalgo, agreed to sell the airline to British Airways' and Iberia's parent- IAG for around €1 billion ($1.1 billion) in November 2019. Globalia and IAG agreed to amend the terms of the deal in January 2021, cutting the transaction price in half to €500 million. The plans, however, were scrapped in November 2021, with both parties seeking ways to revive it, with a deadline set for the end of January 2022. In August 2022, IAG converted a loan to Air Europa into a 20% shareholding. In February 2023, IAG agrees to buy Air Europa for €400 million, with the brand remain intact despite being part of Iberia.

Destinations

Air Europa operates tour services between northern and western Europe and holiday resorts in the Canary Islands and Balearic Islands. It also operates domestic scheduled services and long-haul scheduled services to North America and South America from Madrid. Its hub is Adolfo Suárez Madrid-Barajas Airport.

Codeshare agreements
, Air Europa has codeshare agreements with the following airlines:

 Aeroflot
 Aerolíneas Argentinas
 Aeroméxico
 Air France
 Air Serbia
 Binter Canarias
 Canaryfly
 China Airlines
 China Eastern Airlines
 Copa Airlines
 Czech Airlines
 Delta Air Lines
 Etihad Airways
 Ethiopian Airlines
 Garuda Indonesia
 ITA Airways
 KLM
 Korean Air
 Middle East Airlines
 Saudia
 TAROM
 Turkish Airlines
 Vietnam Airlines
 XiamenAir

Fleet

Current fleet
, Air Europe operates an all-Boeing mainline fleet (excluding Air Europa Express) composed of the following aircraft:

Historical fleet
Air Europa previously operated the following aircraft:

See also
Air Europe (1979–1991)
Air Europe (Italy) (1989–2008)
List of airlines of Spain
Transport in Spain

References

External links

 

Airlines established in 1986
Airlines of Spain
Companies of the Balearic Islands
International Airlines Group
Llucmajor
SkyTeam
Spanish brands
Spanish companies established in 1986
Transport in Mallorca